Ardhasaig is a settlement on the western coast of north Harris, in the Outer Hebrides, Scotland. Ardhasaig is also within the parish of Harris, and is situated on the A859 which links Harris with Stornoway. The settlement lies near to the junction of the B887 with the A859. Ardhasaig has a petrol station, shop and hotel.

References

External links

Canmore - Harris, Ardhasaig site record
Canmore - Harris, Ceann An Ora Bridge site record

Villages in Harris, Outer Hebrides